Young Sinners is a 1958 French-Italian film directed by Marcel Carné.

Jean Paul Belmondo appears in one of his earliest roles.

The movie was a massive box office hit in France, with admissions of 4,953,600.

Cast 
Pascale Petit as Mic
Andréa Parisy as Clo
Jacques Charrier as Bob Letellier
Laurent Terzieff as Alain
Jean-Paul Belmondo as Lou
Dany Saval as Nicole
Jacques Portet as Guy
Pierre Brice as Bernard
 Alfonso Mathis as Peter
Roland Armontel as Surgeon
Jacques Marin as Félix
Roland Lesaffre as Roger
Claude Giraud as Toni

Reception
The film was the fifth biggest hit of the year in France.  It was the biggest film of the year in Switzerland.

References

External links

Young Sinners at Le Film Guide

1958 films
French teen drama films
French coming-of-age drama films
1950s teen drama films
1950s coming-of-age drama films
1950s French-language films
1950s French films